"Only Jesus" is a song by American contemporary Christian and Christian rock band Casting Crowns. The song was released as the lead single from their upcoming 2018 album with the same name on August 10, 2018. The song peaked at No. 3 on the US Hot Christian Songs chart, becoming their twenty-sixth Top 10 single, the second most Top 10 songs in the chart's history. The song is played in a D major key, and 124 beats per minute. The song became their first Christian Airplay No. 1 since "Courageous" in 2011.

Background
"Only Jesus" was released on August 10, 2018, as the lead single on their eighth studio album of the same name. A lyric video was released on August 21, 2018. This song finds frontman Mark Hall musing on the idea of what he will be remembered for when his life is over. He believes that his only accomplishments are those things where Jesus has been at work. Hall explained: "There's much talk these days about legacy. How do we want to be remembered? The more I think about it the more I'm reminded that anything in me that's worth remembering are the things that Jesus has worked on, and is still working on in me. On my own I have nothing to offer the world, but Jesus does - so don't mind me. Jesus is the only name to remember."

The single was also written by American contemporary Christian musician Matthew West, who also features on the track "Nobody."

Accolades

Charts

Weekly charts

Year-end charts

Certifications

References

2018 songs
2018 singles
Casting Crowns songs
Songs written by Mark Hall (musician)
Songs written by Matthew West
Songs written by Bernie Herms
Songs about Jesus